This is a list of defunct hotels in Canada.

Defunct hotels in Canada
British Columbia
 Hotel Vancouver, Vancouver

Ontario
 Duke of York Inn, Toronto
 The Edwin, Toronto
 Empress Hotel (Toronto) 
 Ford Hotel, Toronto
 Highland Inn, Algonquin Provincial Park
 Inn on the Park, North York
 Guild Inn, Toronto
 John Finch's Hotel, Toronto
 Lord Simcoe Hotel, Toronto
 Minaki Lodge, Minaki
 Montgomery's Inn, Etobicoke
 Rossin House Hotel, Toronto
 Royal Connaught Hotel, Hamilton
 Royal Edward Arms, Thunder Bay
 Russell House (Ottawa) 
 Warwick Hotel (Toronto) 

Quebec
 Chateau Aeroport-Mirabel, Mirabel
 Donegana's Hotel, Montreal
 Exchange Coffee House, Montreal
 Laurentian Hotel, Montreal
 Mount Royal Hotel, Montreal
 Ottawa Hotel, Montreal 
 Place Viger, Montreal
 Windsor Hotel (Montreal)

Yukon
 Grand Forks Hotel, Dawson City

See also

 List of defunct hotel chains
 Lists of hotels – an index of hotel list articles on Wikipedia

References

Lists of hotels in Canada
Hotels In Canada
Hotels